Malakhovo is a rural locality in Belyayevsky Selsoviet Rural Settlement, Konyshyovsky District, Kursk Oblast, Russia. Population:

Geography 
The village is located on the Vandarets River (a left tributary of the Svapa River), 47 km from the Russia–Ukraine border, 76 km north-west of Kursk, 14 km north-west of the district center – the urban-type settlement Konyshyovka, 2.5 km from the selsoviet center – Belyayevo.

 Climate
Malakhovo has a warm-summer humid continental climate (Dfb in the Köppen climate classification).

Transport 

The rural locality is situated 83 km from Kursk Vostochny Airport, 172 km from Belgorod International Airport and 285 km from Voronezh Peter the Great Airport.

References

Notes

Sources

Rural localities in Konyshyovsky District